Justice Rice may refer to:

James A. Rice (b. 1957), associate justice of the Montana Supreme Court
John Campbell Rice (1864-1937), associate justice of the Idaho Supreme Court
Nancy E. Rice (b. 1950), chief justice of the Colorado Supreme Court
Philip L. Rice (1886-1974), associate justice of the Supreme Court of Hawaii
Richard D. Rice, associate justice of the Maine Supreme Judicial Court
Samuel Farrow Rice (1816-1890), associate justice of the Alabama Supreme Court